The Bartlebees are a German rock band formed in Munich in 1990.

Discography

"The Bartlebees" (self titled) (1993)
"Finally We Did It" (1993)
"What Is It All About?" (1994)
"Miracles For Sale" (1995)
"Moshi Moshi, Who Are You?" (1996)
"Urban Folk Legends" (1997)

Compilation:

"From Path of Pain to Jewels of Glory" (1995)

External links
The Bartlebees at allmusic.com
The Bartlebees at Discogs.com

German rock music groups